Santa Brígida is a town and a municipality in the northeastern part of the island of Gran Canaria in the Province of Las Palmas of the Canary Islands. Its population is 18,791 (2013), and the area is 23.81 km². It is situated in the mountains, 13 km southwest of Las Palmas.

Historical population

Sites of interest

Bandama Caldera (The Caldera de Bandama Natural Monument), part of the Tafira Protected Landscape. The steep walk to the bottom of the caldera takes about half an hour. Volcanic ash of different hues is in great abundance, and there are some interesting botanic species of Canary Islands origin. 
 Archaeological sites in Santa Brígida. In the valley of La Angostura and Las Meleguinas one can find numerous traces of Aboriginal Canarians that have prompted the declaration of the area as a Cultural, as groups of caves carved into rock, silos or sidewalks. In the archaeological site of El Tope, discovered on 16 July 1988, where you can see remnants that suggest the existence of an aboriginal burial mound, as well as ceramics, pottery and curious pintaderas. It has been discovered Libyan-Berber inscriptions and some vessels (which are now in the Museo Canario). Also in the same area in the wall of the volcano is the Cueva de Los Frailes, a set of 37 caves discovered in 1933.

Panorama

Santa Brígida

Santa Brígida

Santa Brígida

Gallery

See also
List of municipalities in Las Palmas

References

Municipalities in Gran Canaria